North Clarion County Junior/Senior High School is a public Junior/Senior High School in rural northern Clarion County, Pennsylvania. It has 346 Students and 26 faculty members.

Graduation Requirements
Students at North Clarion must obtain 24 Credits of coursework in Grades 9-12, satisfactorily complete an Graduation Project, and pass the PSSA's in order to graduate.

Credit Structure

Courses Available
 English
 World Geography
 Mathematics
 Science
 History
 Foreign Languages - Including courses in French and Spanish
 Business Education - Including courses in Desktop Publishing and Multimedia
 Industrial Technology - Including Drafting
 Art
 Physical Education - PE in Grades 9-11 includes instruction in Drug & Alcohol issues
 Health
 Driver's Education
 Music - Chorus and Band are the only areas of instruction offered at North Clarion

Athletics 
North Clarion Participates in District IX 9 of the PIAA and is in the KSAC Conference.

References 

Public middle schools in Pennsylvania
Public high schools in Pennsylvania
Schools in Clarion County, Pennsylvania